Ligota Prószkowska  (German Ellguth Proskau) is a village in the administrative district of Gmina Prószków, within Opole County, Opole Voivodeship, in south-western Poland.

The village has a population of 880.

References 

Villages in Opole County